Lovely Rita is a 2001 Austrian drama film directed by Jessica Hausner. It was screened in the Un Certain Regard section at the 2001 Cannes Film Festival.

Cast
 Barbara Osika – Rita
 Christoph Bauer – Fexi
 Peter Fiala – Bus driver
 Wolfgang Kostal – Rita's father
 Karina Brandlmayer – Rita's mother
 Gabriele Wurm Bauer – Fexi's mother
 Harald Urban – Fexi's father
 Felix Eisier – Fexi's brother
 Agnes Napieralska – Rita's sister
 Rene Wanko – Rita's brother-in-law
 Marcia Knoppel – Rita's niece
 Ursula Pucher – Teacher
 Lili Schageri – Alex
 Frau Urban – Alex's mother
 Bettina Grossinger – Colleague

References

External links

2001 films
2001 drama films
Austrian drama films
2000s German-language films
Films directed by Jessica Hausner